Anastasia Rizikov (born December 8, 1998) is a Canadian classical pianist. ...Ms. Rizikov is an extraordinary virtuoso, with abundant technical prowess. But she is more than the sum of ten fingers – she is a consummate artist, born to play, to love the art and act of music-making... was written about her by Renée Silberman at The Beat Magazine, January 21, 2014.


Biography 

Anastasia Rizikov was born in Toronto, Ontario, Canada. She began her studies at age of five, and since then showed unparalleled dedication to both practice and performance. Since 2004, she studies with award-winning piano teacher Maia Spis at the Nadia Music Academy in Toronto. In 2017-2019 she studied with Rena Shereshevskaya and Marian Rybicki at École Normale de Musique de Paris (Paris, France, 2019) where she received her Diplôme Supérieur de Concertiste.  Ms. Rizikov also has played in master classes for Sergei Babayan, Vladimir Feltsman, Awadagin Pratt, Arie Vardi, Robert Levin, Ferenc Rados, Anatoly Ryabov, Oxana Yablonskaya, and has worked with András Schiff, Emanuel Ax, Menahem Pressler, Gabor Takács-Nagy, and Olga Kern. 
 
Anastasia is currently on the international competition circuit, winning many awards in the process. In 2017 she won 3rd Prizes at 6th Tbilisi International Piano Competition and 63rd Maria Canals International Music Competition receiving special prizes in both of them:  “For the best foreign performer of a Georgian Composer’s work” (Tbilisi, Georgia, 2017); “Special Prize to the youngest semi-finalist”, “Special Prize to the best performance of Isaac Albeniz’s music’, and “Special Prize to the best performance of Frederic Mompou's music”, (Barcelona, Spain, 2017). Earlier, in September, 2015 she received 1st place in the Ettore Pozzoli International Piano Competition in Seregno, Italy, along with prizes for best compulsory work by E. Pozzoli, and audience prize. On April 17, 2015, Anastasia Rizikov swept the field of 66 entrants to win the Gold Medal and all other prizes in the 57th Jaén International Piano Competition in Jaén, Spain. At the age of 16, Ms. Rizikov was one of the youngest musicians to perform, and she performed with great artistry and passion.  Anastasia stands out as the first Canadian and one of the youngest prize winners in the history of the competition, an event with a long and venerable history. ( "Jaén Prize" is a member of the World Federation of International Music Competitions, itself a member of the International Music Council (UNESCO) since 1966). In November 2013 she captured first prize in the 13th «Giuliano Pecar» International Piano Competition in Gorizia, Italy; and in May 2011 - first prize in the Rotary International Piano Competition in Palma de Mallorca, Spain. Choosing to enter the more challenging Senior Category in both competitions (age 35 and under) she had become the youngest person to compete in their history – winning over players twice her age! She returned to Spain in June, 2012 for a series of solo recitals, as well as for the E. Grieg's Piano Concerto in A minor, op. 16 performance with Balearic Symphony Orchestra at Royal Palace of La Almudaina in Palma de Mallorca. In 2010, Anastasia won first place in the Thousand Islands International Piano Competition for Young People (Cape Vincent, NY).  She also won first place at American Protégé 2010 International Piano and Strings Competition and performed in New York City's Carnegie Hall.  She had already performed at Carnegie Hall before, when, in 2009, Anastasia became the first-place winner at the Bradshaw and Buono International Piano Competition.  In 2008, representing Canada, Anastasia performed with great success in the Kremlin, Moscow at the international festival "Moscow Meets Friends", organized by Vladimir Spivakov's International Charity Foundation; she was awarded the Festival's medal and diploma.  Also in 2008, Anastasia had the honour of performing at the fourth "Young Stars of the Young Century" Gala Concert organized by Vladimir Spivakov's Charity Foundation, which took place in the Toronto Centre for The Arts.  In 2006, Anastasia became the first-place winner at The Vladimir Horowitz International Young Pianists Competition in Kyiv, Ukraine, again, representing Canada. She was also given a special award for Best Artistic Performance and, at age seven, made her orchestral debut, performing Polunin's Concertino in A minor with the National Philharmonic Symphony Orchestra of Ukraine, conducted by Mykola Diadiura at the Concert Hall of National Kyiv Philharmonic. Following this competition the USA Concert Tour of Winners was organized, in which Anastasia had participated with a big success.

Nationally, Anastasia Rizikov is also a first prize winner at both the Canadian Music Competition (CMC) and the Canadian Chopin Competition.  The Chopin Competition, held every five years, led to Anastasia's appearance at a gala winners' concert at Koerner Hall in Toronto.  For the first five years of her musical career Anastasia won first places at several local competitions in the Greater Toronto Area, including Markham Music Festival, Yips Music Festival, North York Music Festival, Peel Music Festival, Davenport Music Festival, Toronto Music Competition, Kiwanis Music Festival of Greater Toronto, Kiwanis Provincial Music Festival, and the Canadian Music Competition (CMC).

In June, 2012 Anastasia was awarded the prestigious 2013 "Debut Atlantic" concert tour. The 2,5 week long tour along the Canadian Atlantic coast was held in September, 2013.

In December, 2012, in honour of Glenn Gould's 80th Anniversary Year and his Grammy Lifetime Achievement Award, The Glenn Gould Foundation has provided a C1X Yamaha baby grand piano to the "outstanding young pianist Anastasia Rizikov. Ms. Rizikov has the piano on an indefinite loan-basis to aid in her artistic and career development."

In 2014, at the age of 15, Anastasia has performed one of the most technically challenging piano concertos – Rachmaninoff No. 3 in D minor with Orchestre symphonique de Laval in collaboration with conductor Alain Trudel in Quebec.

In 2015, Ms. Rizikov performed in major international music festivals like the Orford Music Festival, and the Verbier Music Festival.

Anastasia's concert schedules had taken her to Asia, all over Europe - Spain, Italy, Switzerland, France, Poland, Ukraine, Russia, to the United States, and Canada, where she has played in prestigious halls and spaces such as Carnegie Hall, Roy Thomson Hall, Koerner Hall, Fazioli Hall, Auditorio Manuel de Falla, Hong Kong City Hall, and the Kremlin.

Anastasia had performed with following orchestras: National Philharmonic Symphony Orchestra of Ukraine, Northwest Chicago Symphony Orchestra, Plymouth Symphony Orchestra (Michigan Philharmonic), Toronto Sinfonietta, International Symphony Orchestra, Orquesta Sinfónica de Baleares "Ciudad de Palma", National Academy Orchestra of Canada, Sinfonia Toronto, Toronto Symphony Orchestra, Michigan Philharmonic Orchestra, Orchestra London Canada, Symphony Nova Scotia, Northumberland Orchestra, Orchestre Symphonique de Laval , Orquesta Ciudad de Granada,; Motor City Symphony Orchestra, HKMA Orchestra, Niagara Symphony Orchestra, Dayton Philharmonic Orchestra, Kitchener-Waterloo Symphony Orchestra, Tbilisi Symphony Orchestra, Saskatoon Symphony Orchestra; and had worked with following conductors: Mykola Diadiura, Michael Holian, John Covelli, Nan Washburn, Matthew Jaskiewicz, Robert Debbaut, Salvador Brotons, Boris Brott, Berislav Skenderović, Shalom Bard, Nurhan Arman, Douglas A. Bianchi, Alain Trudel, Bernhard Gueller, John Kraus, Dina Gilbert, Paul Mann, Bradley Thachuk, Neal Gittleman, Andrei Feher and Michael Newnham.

Anastasia had given interviews to and performed at Canadian Jazz FM 91 and Classical 96.3 FM radio stations, CBC Television news and CBC Radio, Rogers TV, Global Montreal TV, Russian MIX TV (City TV), the Ukrainian TV programs Svitohliad and Kontakt, Toronto Star newspaper, Wholenote magazine, and American WSKG-FM, WSKG-TV channels. An excerpt of one of her videos was briefly shown on The Oprah Winfrey Show during a feature on gifted children. On top of that, Anastasia performed numerous solo-concerts in major cities of The United States of America and Canada.

In fall, 2019 Anastasia will have a 2-week concert tour in the Northern Canadian provinces, organised by Piano Six, which was founded by Janina Fialkowska - the group of six Canadian pianists that A. Rizikov had joined in 2018.

Discography
 "WSKG Sessions"  (2011),
 Anastasia Rizikov, piano
 DVD & CD
 WSKG-TV, Binghamton, NY, United States
 "Piano Recital" (2015)
 Anastasia Rizikov, piano
 CD
 Released on December 2, 2016
 Naxos Records, Jaén, Spain

References

External links 
Anastasia Rizikov's Official Website
Anastasia Rizikov's Official Facebook Page
Anastasia Rizikov's Official YouTube Channel
Anastasia Rizikov's Official Twitter Page

1998 births
Living people
Canadian classical pianists
Canadian women pianists
Child classical musicians
Musicians from Toronto
21st-century classical pianists
Women classical pianists
21st-century women pianists